Chang-min is a Korean masculine given name. The meaning differs based on the hanja used to write each syllable of the name. There are 25 hanja with the reading "chang" and 27 hanja with the reading "min" on the South Korean government's official list of hanja which may be used in given names. 

People with this name include:

Son Chang-min (born 1965), South Korean actor
Choo Chang-min (born 1966), South Korean film director
Lim Chang-min (born 1985), South Korean baseball player (Korean Professional Baseball League)
Mo Chang-min (born 1985), South Korean baseball player (Korean Professional Baseball League)
Lee Chang-min (singer) (born 1986), South Korean singer, member of boy band 2AM
Shim Chang-min (born 1988), known mononymously as Changmin, South Korean singer and actor, member of boy band TVXQ
Sim Chang-min (born 1993), South Korean baseball player
Lee Chang-min (footballer) (born 1994), South Korean football midfielder (K-League Classic)

Fictional characters with this name include:
 Oh Chang-min, in 2014 South Korean television series Emergency Couple

See also
List of Korean given names

References

Korean masculine given names